The Kids Are Alright is a 2021 Spanish comedy film directed by Santiago Segura which stars Segura himself and Leo Harlem. It is a remake of the French film Attention au départ!.

Plot 
Ricardo is charged with accompanying his son, along a group of kids, to a camp in Asturias. Felipe, the grand father of one of the latter, also goes alongside him. However, both end up missing the train, leaving the kids in their own way.

Cast

Production 

Written by the director Santiago Segura alongside Marta González de Vega, the film is a remake of the 2021 French film , which actually hit the French theatres later than the Spanish release.

Shooting took place in Asturias (including Illas, Avilés and ), but footage was also shot in locations of the province of Toledo (Illescas) and the Madrid region.

The film's original song, Tu tren, was performed by Carlos Jean and Bebe.

Release 
Distributed by Warner Bros. Pictures España, the film was theatrically released in Spain on 8 July 2021. It became the highest-grossing Spanish film of 2021.

Reception 
Rubén Romero Santos of Cinemanía gave the film 2 out of 5 stars. Lacking in creativity and displaying characters' indefinition, he found the kids' subplot to be a drag, to the point of "turning the viewer into a little Herod". He also found worrying the turn of the filmmaking career of Santiago Segura, having become an adaptator of inane family comedy films.

Fausto Fernández of Fotogramas gave it 4 out of 5 stars, praising the situations which the Leo Harlem's character set the rest of characters in. He considered both of the two film subplots to work fine: that of the kids in the train, and particularly the complementary one (a sort of road movie).

Raquel Hernández Luján of HobbyConsolas gave the film 45 out of 100 points, considering it to be a clone of previous Segura's proposals, praising the character performed by David Guapo, while decrying the cringeful jokes related to inclusive language and machismo, and overall the stale tone of the film.

Josu Eguren of El Correo gave the film 1 out of 3 stars, considering it fell short in terms of comedy. He pointed out at the film separating the gags dedicated to a child audience and those dedicated to an adult audience, with the "weak group of brats" on one side and the part led by Segura, Harlem and Guapo on the other side.

See also 
 List of Spanish films of 2021

References

External links 
 The Kids Are Alright at ICAA's Catálogo de Cinespañol

Spanish remakes of French films
2021 comedy films
2020s Spanish-language films
Films set on trains
Films set in Asturias
Films shot in Asturias
2020s comedy road movies
Films directed by Santiago Segura
Films scored by Roque Baños
Spanish comedy road movies
Films shot in the province of Toledo
Films shot in the Community of Madrid
Warner Bros. films
Atresmedia Cine films
Bowfinger International Pictures films
2020s Spanish films